Dow Jones News/Retrieval was an online service offered by Dow Jones & Company beginning in 1973, which greatly expanded its subscriber numbers during the 1980s. It focused on financial information offering access to securities prices including quotes on stocks, bonds, options and mutual funds as well as a news data base with items culled from The Wall Street Journal, Barron's and other sources, as well as sports reports, movie reviews, encyclopedia, electronic shopping, and email.  Subscriber numbers rose from 11,000 in 1981 to 205,000 by 1986.

In the 1990s it also provided access to articles from The New York Times and Westlaw.

Fees for using the service were relatively expensive. It cost $30 to subscribe followed by a $12 annual membership fee. Additionally, prime-time usage charges were $2.30 per minute and after-hours access was 44 cents a minute for basic services and general information, and $1.76 a minute for detailed reports such as S.E.C. filings. "Blue Chip" and "Executive" discount plans were available for users who spent a lot of time on the service.

In the mid 1990s, the strategy was changed to provide access to the service to a broader business audience and the pricing was simplified, new software and web-based access was launched and the company became more customer-focused under Timothy M. Andrews, a longtime Dow Jones editorial, technology and marketing executive.  The name was changed to Dow Jones Interactive, and the $125 million revenue business was later merged into Factiva.

Dow Jones Interactive was shut down on June 30, 2003.

References

Online databases
Pre–World Wide Web online services
Dow Jones & Company